This page shows the results of the Men's Wrestling Competition at the 1991 Pan American Games, held from August 2 to August 18, 1991, in Havana, Cuba. The Greco-Roman category was notable as it featured a gold medal performance by Randy Couture, who would later become a multi-time world champion in the UFC. The event also featured a gold medal performance by Mark Coleman, who would later become the first UFC Heavyweight champion.

Men's Freestyle

Freestyle (– 48 kg)

Freestyle (– 52 kg)

Freestyle (– 57 kg)

Freestyle (– 62 kg)

Freestyle (– 68 kg)

Freestyle (– 74 kg)

Freestyle (– 82 kg)

Freestyle (– 90 kg)

Freestyle (– 100 kg)

Freestyle (– 130 kg)

Men's Greco-Roman

Greco-Roman (– 48 kg)

Greco-Roman (– 52 kg)

Greco-Roman (– 57 kg)

Greco-Roman (– 62 kg)

Greco-Roman (– 68 kg)

Greco-Roman (– 74 kg)

Greco-Roman (– 82 kg)

Greco-Roman (– 90 kg)

Greco-Roman (– 100 kg)

Greco-Roman (– 130 kg)

Medal table

See also
 Wrestling at the 1992 Summer Olympics

References
 Sports 123

Events at the 1991 Pan American Games
P
1991
Wrestling in Cuba